Palazzo Farnese is a palace in Rome, Italy.

Palazzo Farnese may also refer to:

Palazzo Farnese, Piacenza
Villa Farnese, Caprarola

See also
House of Farnese